Neelaps is a genus in the family Elapidae of two snakes that are endemic to Australia.

Species
 Neelaps bimaculatus - black-naped burrowing snake
 Neelaps calonotos - black-striped burrowing snake

References 

 
Snakes of Australia
Snake genera